J. Mahapatra (born 1 February 1948) is an Indian Police Service (IPS) officer and served as the police commissioner of the city of Ahmedabad in western India between December 2006 and October 2007. Mahapatra is from the state of Orissa and is an IPS officer of the 1974 cadre. He has also served as the police commissioner of Vadodara and as Additional Director General of CID (intelligence) in the government.

References

Indian police chiefs
Ahmedabad civic officials
Living people
1948 births
Place of birth missing (living people)